Daniel Hunter Williamson (born 30 March 2000) is an Olympic champion New Zealand rower.

Early life
Williamson was born on 30 March 2000 in Auckland and grew up in Beachlands, an outer suburb of Auckland. He attended Howick College, where he took up rowing in 2014. In the following year, he began attending King's College. He was an avid athlete, but his limbs were growing fast. He had to quit soccer due to chronic shin splints. This prompted young Daniel to take up rowing.

Rowing career
At age 14, Dan's rowing career began at Counties Manakau Rowing Club with encouragement from his best friend's mother. He spent his first year rowing for Counties and Howick College. He won 5th in the U16 Single, shocking his friends and family and pushing him to greatness.

Before attending Yale University, Daniel was the 2017 NZ National Champion in U18 2-, U18 4x+, U17 4x+ and he won Bronze in the U17 4+. At the 2017 World Rowing Championships, he won Silver in the M4-. He was also named the 2017 Kings College Sportsman of the year.
In 2018, Williamson was the NZ National Champion in U20 2-, U22 2-, U22 4-, and he won Bronze in the premier 8+. He also won bronze at the 2018 World Rowing U23 Championships in M4-.

In his first year at Yale, he sat in the stroke seat in the 1V to help win gold at the 2019 IRA Nationals. He also helped the Yale 1v to win Eastern Sprints that year. 

He won gold in the men's eight event at the 2020 Summer Olympics.

References

External links
 

2000 births
Living people
New Zealand male rowers
Olympic rowers of New Zealand
Rowers at the 2020 Summer Olympics
Rowers from Auckland
Olympic gold medalists for New Zealand in rowing
Medalists at the 2020 Summer Olympics
People educated at Howick College
People educated at King's College, Auckland